Ian Mitchell may refer to:

 Ian Mitchell (author), Scottish-South African writer
 Ian Mitchell (English cricketer) (1925–2011), English cricketer
 Ian Mitchell (footballer) (1946–1996), Dundee United F.C. player
 Ian Mitchell (ice hockey) (born 1999), Canadian ice hockey defenceman
 Ian Mitchell (murder victim), Scottish man murdered in the House of Blood murders
 Ian Mitchell (musician) (1958–2020), guitarist of Scottish pop group the Bay City Rollers
 Ian Mitchell (South African cricketer) (born 1977), South African cricketer